Camelus knoblochi is an extinct species of camel from the Pleistocene. Remains are known from several localities in the south of Eastern Europe (northern Caucasus, the Sea of Azov, Caspian, Middle and Lower Volga regions), in the east and west of northern Kazakhstan,
as well as in Tajikistan, and the Altai Mountains, and
in the south of western Siberia, southern and western
Transbaikalia, and northern and northeastern China.

Description

Paleoecology
The stratigraphical range of C. knoblochi includes most of the Middle
Pleistocene and Late Pleistocene. This species had its maximum distribution and highest abundance in the Late Middle Pleistocene, when its range extended
from Eastern Europe to Transbaikalia. In the Late Pleistocene, C. knoblochi inhabited a considerable part of
Asia from 391 to 541N between the Urals and northeastern China.

Palynological data and paleozoological contexts indicate that C. knoblochi lived in moist steppe and forest–steppe environments and fed mainly on grassy vegetation, with sprigs and leaves also included. Their extinction was likely caused by climatic aridization during the
Late Pleistocene accompanied by the drastic change of plant communities. In this climatic situation, camels were
displaced to relatively extreme conditions of dry steppe and semi-deserts because of high competition with more efficient phyllophagous and herbivorous animals such as large deer and ruminants. C. knoblochi was eventually rendered extinct through competition with the living Bactrian camel, which is better
adapted to severe environments and to feeding on less nutritious vegetation.

The study of paleolithic remains from Mongolia's Tsagaan Agui site suggest that C. knoblochi became extinct in Mongolia and in Asia roughly 27,000 years ago) as a result of climate changes.

References

Prehistoric mammals of Europe
Prehistoric mammals of Asia
Pleistocene mammals of Europe
Pleistocene mammals of Asia
Pleistocene extinctions
Prehistoric camelids